KRAV-FM (96.5 MHz, "Mix 96.5"), is a commercial radio station in Tulsa, Oklahoma, owned by Cox Radio. It airs a hot adult contemporary radio format, playing a mix of pop hits from the 1990s to today. Its studios and offices are located in the Cox Broadcasting Complex on South Memorial Drive, near Interstate 44 in Tulsa. The transmitter is on Route 97 in the Osage Reservation north of Sand Springs.  Mix 96.5 is also heard on Cox Digital Cable channel 1984.

History
On November 1, 1962, KRAV first signed on.  It was owned by the Boston Broadcasting Company, with George R. Kravis II as president and general manager.  (The call sign is the first four letters of Kravis' last name.)  A stand-alone FM radio station was rare in the 1960s, when there were few FM receivers; most FM stations were co-owned by AM stations, simply simulcasting the same programming.

At first, KRAV's effective radiated power was 20,000 watts from a 330-foot-tower, giving it a fraction of the coverage it has today. In 1966, Kravis bought AM station KFMJ (now KGTO), a 1,000 watt daytimer, to pair with KRAV.  It aired classic country music, while KRAV continued with its easy listening/middle of the road format. In the 1970s, KRAV moved to an adult contemporary format, while KFMJ switched to a Christian radio format.

In 1976, KRAV moved from AC to a Hot AC format as FM96 KRAV, also calling itself V96 FM. In the 1990s, KRAV's power was boosted to 100,000 watts, though broadcasting from a 137-foot-tall tower.

In 1996, Kravis sold KRAV and KFMJ to Cox Radio for $5.5 million.  Cox continued the Hot AC format on KRAV, while switching KFMJ to adult standards and oldies as KGTO. KRAV and KGTO moved into studios on South Yale Avenue, along with co-owned KRMG. KGTO would be sold to Perry Broadcasting several years later.

Its signal now extends from the Kansas border to the suburbs of Oklahoma City.

References

External links

RAV-FM
Hot adult contemporary radio stations in the United States
Cox Media Group
Radio stations established in 1962
1962 establishments in Oklahoma